Z Series may refer to:
 Nissan Z-car, a series of Japanese sports cars
 Honda Z series, mini-bikes
 BMW Z Series of two-seat roadsters
 Fujifilm FinePix Z-series, digital cameras
 Z-series trains – overnight express trains in China
 IBM zSeries, mainframe computers
 Z series space suits – A series of prototype spacesuits
 Samsung Galaxy Z series, foldable smartphones
 Sony Xperia Z series, smartphones
 Sony Walkman Z series, digital audio players
 Sony Ericsson Z series, a series of cell phones

See also
 Y series (disambiguation)
 A series (disambiguation)